Texxas Jam was the informal nickname of an annual summer rock concert called the Texxas World Music Festival (1978–1988). It was held in Dallas at the Cotton Bowl, and in Houston, at either the Astrodome or the Rice Stadium on the campus of Rice University.

The original Texxas Jam was a three-day festival held over the Fourth of July weekend in 1978 and encompassed rock and country. Texxas Jam was created by Louis Messina, promoter of Pace Concerts in Houston, and David Krebs, manager of the rock acts Ted Nugent and Aerosmith.  Krebs wanted to duplicate the music festival California Jam II (held March 18, 1978 in Ontario, California) in Texas. Krebs was unfamiliar with the territory, so he contacted Messina in Houston.

A book, Texxas Jam: 1978–1988, was published in March 2011 covering all 11 Texxas Jams.

Artists who performed at the Texxas Jam
(Headliners marked in bold.)

1978 (July 1) – Texxas Music Festival, Cotton Bowl, Dallas, Texas (General Admission – $12.50)

Blackstone (Winner of the State-Wide "Battle of the Bands" for opening slot on the 1978 Texxas Jam)
Walter Egan
Van Halen (second appearance in Texas)
Eddie Money
Atlanta Rhythm Section
Head East
Journey
Heart
Ted Nugent
Aerosmith
Frank Marino and Mahogany Rush
Cheech & Chong
Notes: Ted Nugent joined Aerosmith on stage for a rousing rendition of "Milk Cow Blues". For comic relief, Cheech & Chong entertained the crowd between a couple of acts. The temperature reached 104 degrees that day (over 120 degrees on the field). To protect the Cotton Bowl, they covered the surface with black tarps.  Over 100,000 people were in attendance on the hottest day of the decade.  The concert had hose sprinklers around the field edge to cool people off, and they hosed the crowd down with firehoses from the stage. First aid stations were busy.

This was the first southern stadium rock show since ZZ Top played to 80,000 people at UT Austin on September 1, 1974 and tore up the field. In the aftermath of the ZZ Top UT show there was never supposed to be another stadium rock show in Texas again, an informal prohibition that lasted all of four years. 
 
 
1978 (July 23) – Cotton Bowl Jam 2, Cotton Bowl, Dallas, Texas
Bob Welch
Little River Band
Steve Miller
Fleetwood Mac
 
 
1979 (June 9) – Texxas Music Festival, Cotton Bowl, Dallas, Texas (General Admission – $15.00)
TKO
Sammy Hagar
Nazareth
Van Halen
Boston
Heart
Blue Öyster Cult
Notes: TKO was managed by the same management as Heart at the time, which is the reason for their appearance on the bill. KTXQ-FM Q-102 simulcast much of this concert throughout the day, with TKO, Hagar, Nazareth, and portions of Heart's show aired live. Van Halen's set was not broadcast. KTXQ had to unplug Heart's sound equipment for Boston's set, which they did before the band took the stage.  As a result, only a portion of Heart's set was aired, the sound being broadcast from microphones placed around the Cotton Bowl.
 
 
1979 (Sunday, August 26) – Cotton Bowl in Dallas (General Admission – $15.00)  "A Farewell To A Texas Summer"
Officially called "The Last Concert of the Last Weekend of the Last Summer of the Seventies". 
Rush (Permanent Waves "warmup" tour)
Foghat
Pat Travers
Joan Jett & The Blackhearts
Billy Thorpe
Little River Band
Point Blank

Note: Rush performed pre-studio versions of "The Spirit of Radio" and "Freewill".
 
 
1980 (June 21) – Cotton Bowl in Dallas (General Admission – $16.50)
Eagles
Cheap Trick
Foreigner
April Wine
Sammy Hagar
Christopher Cross

Notes: Savvy was bumped at the last minute by The Eagles' management. (Show lineup confirmed by Steve Jones of Savvy.) Christopher Cross, who already didn't fit on the hard-rocking Texxas Jam stage, was resoundingly booed at the outset of "Sailing", then later cut his set short after throwing up on stage due to heat exhaustion. The Eagles refused to play at first and were an hour late going on due to issues with the 'Hard Rock' line up.
 
 
1981 (July 18) – Astrodome in Houston (General Admission – $17.00) 
REO Speedwagon
Heart
Blue Öyster Cult
Foghat
The Rockets
Notes: Savvy was originally scheduled to open, but was bumped by REO Speedwagon's management (same management as The Eagles in 1980). (Show lineup confirmed by Steve Jones of Savvy.)

Notes: The '81 Jam was held in Houston that year because of the intense summer heat in Texas. The promoters  decided to move it indoors to the Astrodome in Houston, marking the Jam's first Houston date. The festival would be split between Dallas and Houston through 1984. 
 
 
1982 (Dallas-June 12, Houston-June 13)
Journey
Santana
Sammy Hagar
Joan Jett
Point Blank
Notes: It was a hot day that day. Sammy Hagar had a guitar stolen backstage at the Cotton Bowl show; it was returned later that day. However, Hagar vowed to never play it again after it had been handled by someone else, and lit it on fire on stage.  Right before Santana's set, the house music mix played their hit "Winning", the lead singer and other band members came onstage and motioned to the sound mixers to try to get the song cut off; afterwards the band did not play "Winning" during their set.

 
Correction: Sammy's guitar was stolen from a previous Dallas show. Was recovered and Sammy held it until the Texxas Jam. Where he explained the incident and destroyed the guitar. 
The guitar was never set on fire. Sammy smashed the guitar onstage and threw it into the crowd. 
 
 
1982 (August) (Cotton Bowl Dallas, TX) This show was referred to as "The Super Bowl of Rock N Roll".  This show was late summer & was not truly considered a Texxas Jam.
 Le Roux was the warm up (beginning) act. 
Ozzy Osbourne
Loverboy  
Foreigner 
Notes: Ozzy had a shaved head and black makeup around his eyes – from a distance, it looked like a skull.

 
1983 (Dallas – June 18, Houston – June 19)
Styx (Kilroy Was Here tour)
Sammy Hagar
Triumph
Ted Nugent
Uriah Heep
Notes: Hagar came on just before Styx at the end. Ted Nugent and Rik Emmett joined Sammy Hagar on stage in Dallas for their version of Led Zeppelin's "Rock 'n Roll." Tommy Shaw recalls these shows - particularly Dallas - as being some of the worst of his career. He claims to have feared for his life as his band was performing nothing but the rock opera "Kilroy Was Here" after some of the best hard rock bands of the day had performed, combined with other factors including triple-degree temperatures and rowdy concertgoers. (This was the tour that essentially ended Styx.)
 
 
1984 (June 8) Houston Astrodome / (June 10) Cotton Bowl in Dallas 
Rush (Grace Under Pressure tour)
.38 Special (Tour de Force tour)
Ozzy Osbourne (Bark at the Moon tour)
Bryan Adams (Reckless Tour)
Gary Moore (Victims of the Future tour)
Notes: Bryan Adams' drummer for this show was Matt Frenette of Loverboy.
 
 
1985 (August 24) – Cotton Bowl in Dallas
Deep Purple (Perfect Strangers tour)
Scorpions
Night Ranger
Ted Nugent
Bon Jovi
Grim Reaper
Victory
  
 
1986 (July 19)
Van Halen
Dio
Loverboy
Krokus
Keel
Bachman–Turner Overdrive
Notes: Leslie West joined BTO on stage to perform Mountain's "Mississippi Queen."
 
 
1987 (June 20) – Cotton Bowl in Dallas (General Admission – $20.25)
Boston
Aerosmith
Whitesnake
Poison
Tesla
Farrenheit

Notes: The live concert footage for Poison's video "I Won't Forget You" was filmed at this performance. The crowd seemed wild about Poison while in actuality a drunk concertgoer was on top of a lighting tower (about 30' up) trampolining on the tarp roof in nothing but a pair of blue jeans. The crowd really enjoyed him and the Dallas PD's attempt to get him safely to the ground. Also, Poison was joined onstage by Paul Stanley for their performance of KISS' "Strutter". The temperature in Dallas that day reached 104 degrees Fahrenheit, prompting many in the very crowded ground area to pass out and be lifted overhead to the indoor areas of the stadium where there were water fountains. Water from hoses was also sprayed on the concertgoers in the field.
 
 
1988 (a.k.a. "The Monsters of Rock", July 3) – Cotton Bowl in Dallas (General Admission – $25)
Van Halen (OU812 Tour)
Scorpions (Savage Amusement tour)
Dokken
Metallica (Between Master of Puppets Tour and ...And Justice for All Tour). 
Kingdom Come

Notes: Metallica played "Harvester of Sorrow" for the first time live. Van Halen's Sammy Hagar lost his voice after only a couple of songs. He then promised to play a free show in Dallas. A few years later, Van Halen followed through on that promise.

See also

List of historic rock festivals
List of heavy metal festivals
List of music festivals in the United States

References

External links
 Blackstone – Blackstone Archives Site

Music festivals established in 1978
World music festivals
Rock festivals in the United States
Heavy metal festivals in the United States
Music festivals in Texas